The increase in the conductivity of an electrolyte solution when the applied voltage has a very high frequency is known as Debye–Falkenhagen effect. Impedance measurements on water-p-dioxane and the methanol-toluene systems have confirmed Falkenhagen's predictions made in 1929.

See also
Peter Debye
Debye length
Hans Falkenhagen
Wien effect

References

Electrochemical concepts
Peter Debye